The New South Wales Minister for Skills and Training is a minister in the New South Wales Government and has responsibilities that includes all schools and institutes of higher education in New South Wales, Australia.

The current minister, since 21 December 2021, is Alister Henskens. The minister supports the Minister for Education and Early Learning, Sarah Mitchell.

Together, the ministers administer the portfolio through the Education cluster, in particular the Department of Education, TAFE NSW, and a range of other government agencies.

Ultimately, the ministers are responsible to the Parliament of New South Wales.

List of ministers
The following individuals have been appointed as the Minister for Skills and Training or any preceding titles:

Assistant Ministers

See also 

List of New South Wales government agencies

References

Skills and Training